"Fall Down (Spirit of Love)" is a 1985 gospel single by Tramaine Hawkins.  The single is notable in that it was one of few times a gospel single was equally successful on the dance charts.  "Fall Down (Spirit of Love)" made it to #1 on dance charts for one week in the fall of 1985.  It reached the Top 10 on the soul singles chart, where it peaked at #7.

Cover versions
In 2000, "Fall Down (Spirit of Love)" was remade by gospel singer Kelli Williams as "Fall Down 2000".

References

1985 singles
Gospel songs
1985 songs
A&M Records singles
Songs written by Vassal Benford